"The Trouble with Us" is a song by English DJ Marcus Marr and Australian musician Chet Faker. The song is the taken from their extended play (EP) Work.

Background
Faker and Marr first connected via social media. In a media press, Marr explained Faker had posted one of his songs on Twitter. Marr messaged and thanked Faker and a conversation began. They exchanged song ideas and agreed to do something together. The pair met in Marr's South London recording studio in 2015 and recorded the 4-track EP in four days.
"It was a real thrill as the songs came together," Marr said. "As far as working out lyrics and music, [Faker] is super-talented". "The Trouble with Us" made its world premier on Triple J on 15 October 2015 on Linda Marigliano's 'Good Nights' show and was released commercially the following day.

Critical reception
Katie Cunningham from In the Mix described the song as an “intergalactic funk-tinged track".

Sally McMullen from MusicFeeds described the song as "fuelled by catchy hooks and a funk-flecked guitar riff, it’s a fun-filled track that would be an absolute killer live".

Music video
The music video was released on 10 December 2015. The video was directed by Kinopravda and filmed in Korda Studios.

Charts

Weekly charts

Year-end charts

Certifications

References

2015 singles
2015 songs
Chet Faker songs